American Whig may refer to:

 Patriot (American Revolution), in 18th-century America
 Whig Party (United States), in 19th-century America

See also
 British Whig